The Manchester Metro News is a British weekly newspaper published each Friday by Reach plc. It was established in 1987 as a free sister paper to the Manchester Evening News featuring a round up of the week's news. These days the paper also has a 12-page supplement called Metromagazine and a total circulation of 308,589 in the south Manchester area (VFD July to Dec 2004).
It has a smaller geographical reach than the M.E.N.. It is delivered in south and east Manchester, Stockport, Trafford and the Wilmslow area - and has three separate geographical editions: City (in south and east Manchester), Trafford (in Trafford and Wythenshawe) and Stockport (in Stockport and Wilmslow). Most of the content of the paper is the same for all three editions, but a few pages differ, with more local advertising and editorial. In February 2010 along with the Guardian Media Group's other regional and local titles, the newspaper was sold to competitor Trinity Mirror plc. This was in order to safeguard the future of the loss making newspaper The Guardian.

Its first editor was Bryan Chadderton. He was succeeded by Robert Ridley, now assistant editor of the Manchester Evening News, who edited the newspaper until 1998. Then: John Jeffay 1998–2002, Richard Butt 2002–2006, Tim Oliver 2006–present.

Metro
Metro International in Scandinavia started a trend for freesheet papers distributed daily to workers in populated area and this idea was brought the UK by Associated Newspapers who also decided to use the Metro name for their venture. However when Associated Newspapers wanted to launch their Metro in Manchester, Guardian Media Group (GMG) also decided to launch a freesheet daily paper in the city under the Metro name, with the argument that GMG's Manchester Metro News had been established in the region for many years.

For a short time, Associated's Metro competed with GMG's daily Manchester Metro News (using the same name as the separate weekly newspaper above). Associated was forced to change its title's name to News North West. Eventually, Associated and GMG reached a deal whereby GMG's daily newspaper folded and Associated's paper was allowed to use the "Metro" title again. Some advertising and Metro'''s distribution was taken over by the GMG in Manchester.

See alsoManchester Evening News'' - daily paper

Notes

 Source: Manchester Online

External links
ManchesterOnline - the "dynamic internet edition" of the Manchester Evening News
Metro

Newspapers published in Manchester
Newspapers established in 1987
Newspapers published by Reach plc
Free newspapers